Mehetabel Newman (1822 – 8 January 1908) from Willoughby, Lincolnshire was an English emigrant to New Zealand, where she was a Methodist missionary, a letter-writer, a teacher and a homemaker. Joseph Newman was an older brother.

References

1822 births
1908 deaths
English Methodist missionaries
New Zealand educators
People from East Lindsey District
English emigrants to New Zealand
19th-century New Zealand people
Methodist missionaries in New Zealand
19th-century Methodists
Fairburn–Newman family